The 1928 New Hampshire gubernatorial election was held on November 6, 1928. Republican nominee Charles W. Tobey defeated Democratic nominee Eaton D. Sargent with 57.50% of the vote.

General election

Candidates
Major party candidates
Charles W. Tobey, Republican
Eaton D. Sargent, Democratic

Other candidates
Frank T. Butler, Socialist
Henry C. Iram, Workers

Results

References

1928
New Hampshire
Gubernatorial